Popeye Doyle is an American 1986 television film starring Ed O'Neill as New York City police detective Jimmy "Popeye" Doyle. The film is a sequel to the feature films The French Connection (1971) and French Connection II (1975), in which Doyle had been played by Gene Hackman; Hackman had won the Academy Award for Best Actor for his performance in The French Connection. Popeye Doyle was originally intended as a pilot episode for a series called Popeye Doyle, but the series was not picked up.

The character of Popeye Doyle is based on a real-life New York City police detective, Eddie Egan, who had appeared in The French Connection as Walt Simonson, Doyle's supervisor.

Premise
New York City police Detective Jimmy "Popeye" Doyle investigates the case of a murdered model, which leads him on the trail of a gang of terrorists and a drug cartel of international smugglers.

References

External links
 

Films about the French Connection
1986 television films
1980s English-language films
1986 films
NBC network original films
American detective films
American crime films
1980s crime films
Films about terrorism in the United States
Films scored by Brad Fiedel
Television films as pilots
Television pilots not picked up as a series
Films directed by Peter Levin
1980s American films